Gildersome railway station served the village of Gildersome, West Yorkshire, England, from 1900 to 1921 on the Leeds New Line.

History 
The station was opened on 1 October 1900 by the London and North Western Railway. The goods yard consisted of three sidings as with stables and warehouses. It didn't bring in much revenue due to its remote location and it was only used by workers for the nearby St Bernard's. It closed as a wartime economy measure on 1 August 1917 but reopened on 5 May 1919, only to close again on 11 July 1921.

References

External links 

Disused railway stations in West Yorkshire
Former London and North Western Railway stations
Railway stations in Great Britain opened in 1900
Railway stations in Great Britain closed in 1917
Railway stations in Great Britain opened in 1919
Railway stations in Great Britain closed in 1921
1900 establishments in England
1921 disestablishments in England